NVM may refer to:
 NewVoiceMedia, cloud service company specialising in contact centre technology
 Node Version Manager, a tool for Node.js
 Non-volatile memory, a type of computer memory
 NVM, a 2014 album by Seattle band Tacocat
 National Videogame Museum, a museum in Frisco, Texas
 Newhaven Marine railway station, a disused railway station in Sussex, England
 Shorthand for 'nevermind', used in text messaging

de:Liste von Abkürzungen (Netzjargon)#N